MangaNEXT was a fan convention focused exclusively on Japanese manga that occurred every other year in New Jersey. It was the only manga convention in the United States. The event was discontinued in favor of AnimeNEXT, which is run by the same organization.

Programming
The convention typically offered an artists alley, burlesque show, dealer's room, and swap meet.

History
MangaNEXT was located at the Crowne Plaza Meadowlands in Secaucus, New Jersey for 2007. In 2008 the convention moved to the Doubletree Somerset Hotel in Somerset, New Jersey for additional space, but suffered from some disorganization and poor communication. The convention in 2012 moved to the Sheraton Hotel in East Rutherford, New Jersey, which had no public transit access.

Event history

See also

AnimeNEXT
List of anime conventions

References

Defunct anime conventions
Recurring events established in 2006
2006 establishments in New Jersey
Annual events in New Jersey
Conventions in New Jersey
Festivals in New Jersey
New Jersey culture